Monsieur, Madame and Bibi (French: Monsieur, Madame et Bibi) is a 1932 French-German comedy film directed by Jean Boyer and Max Neufeld and starring René Lefèvre, Marie Glory and Florelle. It was the French-language version of the German film A Bit of Love.

The film's art director was Ernő Metzner.

Cast
 René Lefèvre as Monsieur Paul Baumann
 Marie Glory as Madame Clary Baumann
 Florelle as Anne Weber, secretary
 Jean Dax as Mr. Brown
 Suzanne Préville as Maid

Other film versions
 A Bit of Love (March 1932, Germany, directed by Max Neufeld)
 Two Happy Hearts (September 1932, Italy, directed by Baldassarre Negroni)
 Yes, Mr Brown (January 1933, UK, directed by Herbert Wilcox)

References

Bibliography 
 Crisp, Colin. Genre, Myth and Convention in the French Cinema, 1929–1939. Indiana University Press, 2002.

External links 
 

1932 films
1932 comedy films
French comedy films
German comedy films
1930s French-language films
Films directed by Jean Boyer
Films directed by Max Neufeld
French multilingual films
Pathé films
Films scored by Paul Abraham
French black-and-white films
German black-and-white films
1932 multilingual films
1930s French films
1930s German films